Trelissick is a house and garden in the ownership of the National Trust at Feock, near Truro, Cornwall, England. It is located on the B3289 road, just west of King Harry Ferry, and overlooks the estuary known as Carrick Roads. It lies within the Cornwall Area of Outstanding Natural Beauty (AONB). Almost a third of Cornwall has AONB designation.

It receives over 200,000 visitors annually.

History

Trelissick, first recorded in 1275, means Leidic's farm. Trelissick in the parish of St Ewe has the same derivation but Trelissick in St Erth and Trelissick in Sithney have a different one ("Gwledic's farm").

The house was designed around 1750 by the paternal grandfather of Humphry Davy for John Lawrence and remodelled in the 1820s by Thomas Daniell. It was further extended in the late 19th century. It is Grade 2* listed.

The estate has been in the ownership of the National Trust since 1955 when it was donated by Ida Copeland following the death of her son Geoffrey. A stained glass memorial bearing the Copeland coat of arms was donated to Feock parish church by Mrs. Copeland. The house and garden had formerly been owned and developed by the Daniell family, which had made its fortune in the 18th century Cornish copper mining industry.

The contents of the house were sold in July 2013 by Bonhams auctioneers.

Garden

Many of the species that flourish in the mild Cornish air, including the rhododendrons and azaleas which are now such a feature of the garden, were planted by the Copelands including hydrangeas, camellias and flowering cherries, and exotics such as the ginkgo and various species of palm. They also ensured that the blossoms they nurtured had a wider, if unknowing audience. Mr Ronald Copeland was chairman and later managing director of his family's business, the Spode china factory. Flowers grown at Trelissick were used as models for those painted on ware produced at the works.

The Copeland family crest, a horse's head, now decorates the weathervane on the turret of the stable block, making a pair with the Gilbert squirrels on the Victorian Gothic water tower, an echo of the family who lived here in the second half of the 19th century (their ancestor, Sir Humphrey Gilbert, was lost at sea in his ship Squirrel after discovering Newfoundland).

The garden is noted for its rare shrubs. It offers a large park, woodland walks, views over the estuary of the River Fal and Falmouth.

Special plants
Trelissick Garden is the home of the National Plant Collections of photinias and azaras.

Gallery

References

"Trelissick" in Feock with Devoran and Carnon Down in the 19th Century (Part 2) by the Feock Local History Group (1973) Republished 2006 (pp. 39–50) 
 National Trust Guide; October 1996

External links 

 Trelissick information at the National Trust
 Trelissick Garden history

Gardens in Cornwall
National Trust properties in Cornwall
Grade II* listed buildings in Cornwall